Yerokambos is the archaeological site of an ancient Minoan cemetery in central Crete.

Geography
The site is near the modern village of Lendas, south of the Asterousia mountains.

Archaeology
The tombs were built in Early Minoan I and in use through Middle Minoan IA.

References
 Swindale, Ian "Yerokambos" Retrieved 11 Feb 2006

External links
 http://www.minoancrete.com/yerokambos.htm

Minoan sites in Crete
Ancient cemeteries in Greece